Lefteris Velentzas (born 10 October 1970) is a Greek professional football manager and former player.

References

1970 births
Living people
Greece international footballers
Association football midfielders
Apollon Smyrnis F.C. players
Iraklis Thessaloniki F.C. players
A.P.O. Akratitos Ano Liosia players
Egaleo F.C. players
Thrasyvoulos F.C. players
Ilioupoli F.C. players
A.O. Nea Ionia F.C. players
Super League Greece players
Footballers from Athens
Greek footballers
Greek football managers
Apollon Smyrnis F.C. managers